Cimoxatone (MD 780515) is a reversible inhibitor of MAO-A (RIMA). It has a significant food interaction–related adverse effect in combination with tyramine. It was never marketed.

See also 
 Monoamine oxidase inhibitor

References 

Reversible inhibitors of MAO-A
Monoamine oxidase inhibitors
Benzonitriles
3-(4-methoxyphenyl)-2-oxazolidinones
Phenol ethers